Eloise Stenner (born 13 January 1997) is an English international field hockey player who plays as a defender for England U-21 and was in the Great Britain senior squad for the 2019 FIH Pro League.
She has yet to make her full international debut.

She plays club hockey in the Women's England Hockey League Premier Division for Surbiton.

Stenner has previously played for Uni of Nottingham and Beeston.

References

1997 births
Living people
English female field hockey players
Women's England Hockey League players
Surbiton Hockey Club players